Brachyiulus varibolinus is a species of millipede in the family Julidae. It is endemic to the Balkans and is known from Albania and Greece.

References

Julida
Millipedes of Europe
Endemic fauna of the Balkans
Animals described in 1904